Célia Campello Gomes Chacon, born Célia Benelli Campello, known by her stage name Celly Campello (18 June 1942 – 4 March 2003), was a Brazilian singer and performer, a pioneer in Brazilian rock. She also acted in the telenovela Estúpido Cupido.

Life 
Campello was born in São Paulo and raised in Taubaté. She started her career in an early age, performing at local radio shows when she was six years old. She studied piano, classical guitar and ballet during her childhood.

Campello presented her own radio show when she was 12, at Rádio Cacique. In 1958 she recorded her first vinyl in São Paulo together with her brother Tony Campello who accompanied her in most of her career. Her debut in television was at TV Tupi's Campeões do Disco, in 1958. In 1959 she and Tony  presented Celly e Tony em Hi-Fi, at Rede Record, until 1961.

Her breakthrough was in 1959 with the single Estúpido Cupido, the Brazilian version of Stupid Cupid. That same year she was featured in Mazzaropi's feature, Jeca Tatu. Another Campello's songs were Lacinhos Cor de Rosa, Billy and Banho de Lua (version of Tintarella di Luna by Mina).

Campello left the career in 1962, and moved to Campinas. She married José Eduardo Gomes Chacon, and had two children. In 1975 Campello had a brief comeback, presenting with her brother Tony at the Hollywood Rock festival in Rio de Janeiro. In 1976 she had a cameo appearance at TV Globo telenovela Estúpido Cupido, featuring her music in the soundtrack.

Campello died on 4 March 2003 of breast cancer, in Campinas.

Discography

Odeon LPs 
 1959: Come Rock With Me
 1960: Broto Certinho
 1960: A Bonequinha que Canta
 1961: A Graça de Celly Campello e as Músicas de Paul Anka
 1961: Brotinho Encantador
 1962: Os Grandes Sucessos de Celly Campello
 1968: Celly
 1973: Anos 60

RCA Victor LPs 

 1976: Celly Campello
 1981: Disco de Ouro

Filmography 
1960: Zé do Periquito
1960: Jeca Tatu as Singer in pool (final film role)
1975: Ritmo Alucinante (Documentary) as herself
1977: Estúpido Cupido (TV Series) as herself

References

External links 

 

Actors from São Paulo (state)
Brazilian people of Italian descent
Brazilian mezzo-sopranos
Brazilian rock singers
Deaths from cancer in São Paulo (state)
Deaths from breast cancer
2003 deaths
1942 births
20th-century Brazilian women singers
20th-century Brazilian singers